Steven Glenn (born May 4, 1971 in Ottawa, Ontario) is a former Canadian football linebacker who played ten seasons in the Canadian Football League from 1996 to 2005 for five different teams.

References

1971 births
Living people
BC Lions players
Canadian football linebackers
Montreal Alouettes players
Ottawa Gee-Gees football players
Ottawa Renegades players
Players of Canadian football from Ontario
Saskatchewan Roughriders players
Canadian football people from Ottawa
Winnipeg Blue Bombers players